The South Spring Ranch, on Rt. 2 in Roswell, New Mexico, was listed on the National Register of Historic Places in 1989.

The ranch was established in 1874 by John Chisum, to serve as headquarters of his wide-ranging cattle operations. It has also been known as Jinglebob Ranch.

Its main house, built in 1902, is deemed non-contributing to the historic character of the ranch, due to modifications in the 1950s.  It was originally a three-story red brick mansion.

Another brick house, built in early 1900s in "Hipped Box" style, is contributing.

References

Ranches in New Mexico
National Register of Historic Places in Chaves County, New Mexico